The Sunstreak is a band from Rochester, New York.

Career
First known as One Year Nothing, they released an album on B and W records. They played on the Vans Warped Tour in 2002 (before they knew how to play, according to vocalist Tony Rebis), and again in 2006—filling the "Bar-Ba_Q" slot, meaning they played and then cooked for the other bands. Their first album sold 25,000 records in a month, becoming the second band in history to chart on Billboard not having a distribution deal.

The band was named The Sunstreak when they released their major label debut, Once Upon A Lie, on Merovingian, a sublabel owned by EMI.

Line-up
Tony Rebis - vocals
David Schuler - vocals, guitar, keyboards
Gary Foster - drums
Jason Sarkis - bass guitar
Jack Flynn - lead guitar

Discography
Sunstreak (as One Year Nothing, B&W, 2006)
Top Secret (EP, 2008)
Once Upon a Lie (EMI, 2009)

References

External links
Band website

Rock music groups from New York (state)